Hamzeh Khaziravi (born 1994 in Ahvaz, Iran) is an Iranian football forward who currently plays for Iranian football club Padideh in the Persian Gulf Pro League.

Club career
Khaziravi joined Esteghlal Ahvaz in summer 2015, after graduating from Foolad Academy. He made his debut for Esteghlal Ahvaz on July 30, 2015 against Saba Qom where he used as a substitute for Mohammad Gholami.

Club career statistics

References

External links
 Hamzeh Khaziravi at IranLeague.ir

1994 births
Living people
Iranian footballers
Esteghlal Ahvaz players
Association football forwards
People from Ahvaz
Sportspeople from Khuzestan province